Lagoa do Mato may refer to:

District
 Lagoa do Mato, Ceará, district in the state of Ceará.

Municipality
 Lagoa do Mato, municipality in the state of Maranhão.

Windfarm
 Windfarm Lagoa do Mato, car wind power the state of Ceará.